The History & Archaeology Museum in Piatra Neamț, Romania, was founded at the beginning of the 20th century by Constantin Matasă, minister and amateur archaeologist.

The museum shelters the most important collection of Cucuteni culture artifacts and it is the home of the Cucuteni Research Centre. The famous piece, Hora de la Frumuşica ("The Frumuşica Dance," the symbol of Cucuteni culture), can be found on the museum website.

Gallery

References

External links

 360 Virtual Tour of the museum 
 About the museum 
 Virtual expo 

Piatra Neamț
Piatra
Piatra
Archaeological museums in Romania
Museums of Dacia
Cucuteni–Trypillia culture
Museums in Neamț County